Michael Degen (31 January 1928 – 9 April 2022) was a German-Israeli actor, in film and theatre, as well as a theatre director and writer.

Early life
Born in Chemnitz as the younger son of Jewish parents, Degen survived the Holocaust in Berlin, while his older brother was sent to Palestine via Denmark and Sweden. His father, Jacob Degen, was a language professor and businessman of Russian Jewish descent. On 13 September 1939, Jacob Degen was arrested by the Secret State Police and taken to the Sachsenhausen concentration camp. Subjected to severe abuse over the weeks that followed, he was released on 2 February 1940 but never recovered from his injuries, dying shortly afterward. To survive, Michael and his mother, Anna, hid in a Berlin allotment until the end of the war.

In 1946, Degen appeared on stage for the first time and received his education through a scholarship at the acting school of the Deutsches Theater in East Berlin. In 1949, he emigrated to Israel for two years. Degen served as a soldier in Israel and acted in theatres in Tel Aviv.

Career
In 1954, Degen joined Bertolt Brecht's Berliner Ensemble at the Theater am Schiffbauerdamm in East Berlin. In 1955–1956, he worked with the Schauspiel Köln. From 1956 to 1963 he was at the Mannheim National Theatre, followed by the Schauspiel Frankfurt in 1963–1964. During his career, he played Shakespeare's Hamlet 300 times. A reviewer of The Times wrote of Degen's acting in Harry Buckwitz's 1965 Hamlet production at Schauspiel Frankfurt, "Nervously impulsive and sometimes violently emotional". Degen performed in Munich, Salzburg and Hamburg and worked with directors including Ingmar Bergman, George Tabori Peter Zadek and Claude Chabrol. He was Moliere's Dom Juan in Ingmar Bergman's production at the Salzburg Festival and Adam in Kleist's The Broken Jug. He was also a director: his premiere was in Goethe's Urfaust in 1972. Degen began appearing in films in 1963. In Franz Peter Wirth's  Buddenbrooks television adaptation (1979), he played the role of Bendix Grünlich. He played Adolf Hitler in Michael Kehlmann's 1988 film  as well as Dr Martin Sanders in Diese Drombuschs. His last role was the vain Vice-Questore Patta in the television series Donna Leon.

Degen wrote in his 1999 debut  (Not All Were Murderers. A childhood in Berlin.) about his own experiences during the Nazi era.

Personal life
Degen lived with his third wife in Hamburg. He had four children from previous marriages. He was an Israeli and German citizen.

He died on 9 April 2022 in Hamburg, at the age of 94. An obituary of the Frankfurter Allgemeine Zeitung called Degen "an actor of melancholic elegance".

Legacy
In 2006, Jo Baier filmed Degen's memoirs with Aaron Altaras and Nadja Uhl for ARD.

Awards
 1969 Großer Hersfeld-Preis
 1988 
 2003

Selected filmography
Source: 

Source:

Writings
  and

References

Further reading

External links 

1932 births
2022 deaths
20th-century German Jews
20th-century German male actors
21st-century German male actors
German male film actors
German male television actors
Holocaust survivors
Israeli people of German-Jewish descent
Male actors from Hamburg
Jews from Hamburg
Writers from Hamburg